10-20 system may refer to:

 10-20 system (swimming safety), a technique used by lifeguards
 10-20 system (EEG), an electrode placement method used in electroencephalography systems